Arithmetica Universalis ("Universal Arithmetic") is a mathematics text by Isaac Newton. Written in Latin, it was edited and published by William Whiston, Newton's successor as Lucasian Professor of Mathematics at the University of Cambridge. The Arithmetica was based on Newton's lecture notes.

Whiston's original edition was published in 1707. It was translated into English by Joseph Raphson, who published it in 1720 as the Universal Arithmetick. John Machin published a second Latin edition in 1722.

None of these editions credits Newton as author; Newton was unhappy with the publication of the Arithmetica, and so refused to have his name appear. In fact, when Whiston's edition was published, Newton was so upset he considered purchasing all of the copies so he could destroy them.

The Arithmetica touches on algebraic notation, arithmetic, the relationship between geometry and algebra, and the solution of equations. Newton also applied Descartes' rule of signs to imaginary roots. He also offered, without proof, a rule to determine the number of imaginary roots of polynomial equations. Not for another 150 years would a rigorous proof to Newton's counting formula be found, by James Joseph Sylvester, published in 1865.

References
The Arithmetica Universalis from the Grace K. Babson Collection, including links to PDFs of English and Latin versions of the Arithmetica
 Arithmetica Universalis (1720), translated by Joseph Raphson
Centre College Library information on Newton's works

1707 books
1720 books
Mathematics books
Books by Isaac Newton
18th-century Latin books